Placitas may refer to several places:
Placitas, Doña Ana County, New Mexico, a census-designated place
 Placitas, Lincoln County, New Mexico an abandoned village 
Placitas, Sandoval County, New Mexico, a census-designated place
Placitas, Sierra County, New Mexico, the northern or eastern terminus of the NM 142